Gomshall railway station serves the village of Gomshall in Surrey, England. The station, and all trains serving it, are operated by Great Western Railway. It is on the North Downs Line,  measured from  via .

History
The station was opened by the Reading, Guildford and Reigate Railway on 20 August 1849, and was originally named Gomshall and Shere Heath; it was renamed Gomshall and Sheire in March 1850, and Gomshall and Shere in September 1852. On 12 May 1980, the name was simplified to Gomshall. As the older names suggest, it also serves the nearby village of Shere. It has been unmanned since 1967.

Accidents and incidents
On 20 February 1904, a troop train, en route to Southampton, hauled by C class No. 294 was derailed at Gomshall station. There were no fatalities but the locomotive crew and four soldiers of the Northumberland Fusiliers were injured.

Platforms
Gomshall Station has two staggered platforms. A gated foot crossing had been in use to access both until 25 November 2016 when it was replaced by a permanent bridge with ramped and stepped access.

Services
Trains are generally two-hourly off-peak and hourly peak-time, with additional  services stopping at peak-time.

References

Railway stations in Surrey
Former South Eastern Railway (UK) stations
Railway stations in Great Britain opened in 1849
Railway stations served by Great Western Railway
1849 establishments in England